Alan Powell (born May 3, 1985) is an American singer and actor, known for his portrayal of Franklin Weaver in the 2014 film, Where Hope Grows and Mike McQuigg in the third season of the ABC thriller Quantico.

Biography

Alan Powell was born on May 3, 1985, in Nashville, Tennessee, US. In 2009, he made his acting debut in the 2009 film, Charlie & Boots. Following on from his first role, Powell won other roles on a variety of TV shows and films including Nashville, The Song, Caged No More and Christmas in the Smokies.

Powell started the Christian band Anthem Lights in 2007, but left in 2016 to pursue an acting career.

On November 21, 2017, it was announced that Powell joined as a series regular in the third season of the ABC thriller Quantico. He starred in the role of undercover agent, Mike McQuigg.

Filmography

Film

Television

References

External links
 

1985 births
Living people
Male actors from Nashville, Tennessee
American male film actors
21st-century American male actors
American male television actors